Virginia Edith Coffman (July 30, 1914March 31, 2005) was an American writer.

Life 
Virginia Edith Coffman was born on July 30, 1914, in San Francisco and grew up in Long Beach, California. She attended the University of California, Berkeley, from 1933 to 1938, graduating in 1938 with an AB. Before beginning her career as a novelist, she worked in Hollywood in various capacities for David O. Selznick, Monogram Pictures, Hal Roach, and Howard Hughes. While in Hollywood, Coffman wrote screenplays for television and film. Following her work in the film industry, she moved to Reno, Nevada, where she worked at the First National Bank of Nevada. Coffman became a member of the Nevada Writers Hall of Fame in 1990. She died in Reno on March 31, 2005.

Work 
Coffman published at least 109 books. Her first novel, Moura (1959), plays on Gothic tropes. Moura eventually became a five-part series. She published under at least four pseudonyms. Roberts argues that Coffman's fiction combines elements of Gothic fiction, detective fiction, and historical romance.

References 

1914 births
2005 deaths
20th-century American novelists
20th-century American women writers
People from Long Beach, California
University of California, Berkeley alumni
21st-century American women
Writers of Gothic fiction